

42001–42100 

|-id=073
| 42073 Noreen ||  || Noreen Pray, wife of American discoverer Donald P. Pray || 
|}

42101–42200 

|-id=112
| 42112 Hongkyumoon ||  || Hong-Kyu Moon (born 1965) is a planetary scientist at the Korea Astronomy and Space Science Institute (Daejeon, South Korea). He studies survey simulations for near-Earth objects and is P.I. of the DEEP-South observation project for asteroids and comets in the southern sky. || 
|-id=113
| 42113 Jura ||  || Canton of Jura, the 23rd state of Switzerland || 
|-id=175
| 42175 Yuyang ||  || Yang Yu (born 1986) is a professor at Beihang University who studies orbits around irregularly shaped small bodies and has worked on understanding the shape evolution of asteroids. || 
|-id=177
| 42177 Bolin ||  || Bryce T. Bolin (born 1986) is a postdoctoral researcher at the California Institute of Technology (Pasadena, California, United States of America) whose observational and numerical studies focus on mini moons, asteroid families, active asteroids, near-Earth objects, and interstellar objects. || 
|-id=183
| 42183 Tubiana ||  || Cecilia Tubiana (born 1980) is a researcher at the Max Planck Institute for Solar System Research (Göttingen, Germany) who studies the nuclei and dust of comets. She played a core role in the operation of the OSIRIS cameras on the Rosetta mission and is now the payload coordinator for Comet Interceptor. || 
|-id=191
| 42191 Thurmann ||  || Jules Thurmann (1804–1855), French-Swiss geologist and botanist || 
|}

42201–42300 

|-id=271
| 42271 Keikokubota ||  || Keiko Kubota (born 1985) is a Japanese vocalist and original member of the musical group "Kalafina". She has also performed with "FictionJunction". || 
|-id=295
| 42295 Teresateng ||  || Teresa Teng, Taiwanese popular and influential pop singer || 
|}

42301–42400 

|-id=354
| 42354 Kindleberger ||  || Charles P. Kindleberger, American economist || 
|-id=355
| 42355 Typhon ||  || Typhon, mythological enemy of the Olympian gods, leader of the Titans, and its mother, Echidna ((42355) Typhon I Echidna) || 
|-id=365
| 42365 Caligiuri ||  || Michael P. Caligiuri, American neurologist and amateur astro-imager || 
|-id=377
| 42377 KLENOT ||  || KLENOT (initialism of Klet Observatory near Earth and other unusual objects observations team and telescope), a project conducted at the Kleť Observatory in the Czech Republic || 
|}

42401–42500 

|-id=403
| 42403 Andraimon || 6844 P-L || Andraimon, father of the Greek Trojan War hero Thoas || 
|-id=478
| 42478 Inozemtseva ||  || Galina Alexeevna Inozemtseva, the head of Municipal Children's Diagnostic Center in Rostov-on-Don, Russia || 
|-id=479
| 42479 Tolik ||  || Anatolij (Tolik) Leonidovich Zhuravlev, Ukrainian computer expert and engineer, husband of Russian discoverer Lyudmila Zhuravleva || 
|-id=482
| 42482 Fischer-Dieskau ||  || Dietrich Fischer-Dieskau, German baritone, lieder and oratorio singer, orchestra conductor and author || 
|-id=485
| 42485 Stendhal ||  || Stendhal (Marie-Henri Beyle, 1783–1842), an original and complex French writer of the first half of the 19th century. Well known for his masterpieces Le Rouge et le Noir (1830) and La Chartreuse de Parme (1839). || 
|-id=487
| 42487 Ångström ||  || Anders Jonas Ångström, 19th-century Swedish physicist, cofounder of astrospectroscopy || 
|-id=492
| 42492 Brüggenthies ||  || Wilhelm Brüggentihies, a former civil engineer. || 
|}

42501–42600 

|-id=516
| 42516 Oistrach ||  || David Oistrakh (1908–1974), and his son Igor Oistrakh, Jewish-Russian-Ukrainian violin virtuosi || 
|-id=522
| 42522 Chuckberry ||  || Chuck Berry (Charles Edward Anderson, 1926–2017) was an American guitarist, singer and songwriter. He was one of the pioneers of rock and roll. || 
|-id=523
| 42523 Ragazzileonardo || 1994 ES || I Ragazzi della Leonardo ("Leonardo's Children"), Italian cultural association || 
|-id=531
| 42531 McKenna || 1995 LJ || Martin McKenna (born 1978), Irish astronomer. In 2005, he was named "Astronomer of the Year" by the Irish Federation of Astronomical Societies. || 
|-id=566
| 42566 Ryutaro ||  || Ryutaro Hirota (1892–1952), a renowned Japanese composer, was born in Aki city, Kochi prefecture and studied musical composition at Tokyo Music School. || 
|-id=585
| 42585 Pheidippides ||  || Pheidippides (fl. 490 B.C.E.) was a legendary Athenian herald who ran 240 km between the battlefield at Marathon to Athens in two days to report the Greek victory over the Persians. The modern marathon takes its name from this legend. || 
|-id=593
| 42593 Antoniazzi || 1997 JQ || Antonio Maria Antoniazzi (1872–1925), an Italian astronomer. || 
|}

42601–42700 

|-id=609
| 42609 Daubechies ||  || Ingrid Daubechies (born 1954), a Belgian physicist and mathematician. || 
|-id=614
| 42614 Ubaldina ||  || Ubaldina Caronia, mother of Italian co-discoverer Alfredo Caronia || 
|-id=697
| 42697 Lucapaolini ||  || | Luca Paolini (born 1977), one of the best Italian bicycle racers. || 
|}

42701–42800 

|-id=747
| 42747 Fuser ||  || Ireneo Fuser, Italian author and professor of organ, piano and composition || 
|-id=748
| 42748 Andrisani ||  || Donato Andrisani, Italian dental surgeon, amateur astronomer, and friend of Italian discoverer Vittorio Goretti || 
|-id=772
| 42772 Kokotanekova ||  || Rosita Kokotanekova (born 1991) is a Research Fellow at ESO in Garching, Germany. She studies surface characteristics of comets, trans-Neptunian objects, and other small solar system bodies using ground-based photometry. || 
|-id=775
| 42775 Bianchini ||  || Francesco Bianchini, 17th–18th century Italian catholic priest, calendar reformer and astronomer || 
|-id=776
| 42776 Casablanca ||  || Casablanca, Morocco, and Casablanca (1942), one of the most renowned movies of all time || 
|}

42801–42900 

|-id=849
| 42849 Podjavorinská ||  || Ľudmila Podjavorinská (Riznerová), Slovak poet and writer, recipient of a National artist award for her contributions to Slovak literature || 
|}

42901–43000 

|-id=910
| 42910 Samanthalawler ||  || Samantha Lawler (born 1982) is an Assistant Professor at the University of Regina (Canada) who observationally studies small body populations around the Sun and exoplanetary systems. || 
|-id=924
| 42924 Betlem ||  || Hans Betlem (born 1954), Dutch amateur meteor astronomer and founder of the Dutch Meteor Society || 
|-id=929
| 42929 Francini ||  || Claudio Francini (born 1926), Italian amateur astronomer at the discovering San Marcello Observatory || 
|-id=981
| 42981 Jenniskens ||  || Peter Jenniskens (born 1962), American meteor astronomer || 
|-id=985
| 42985 Marsset ||  || Michael Marsset (born 1989) is a postdoctoral associate at MIT (Cambridge, MA). An expert in small solar system bodies, his research includes adaptive optics imaging, photometric colors, and spectroscopic measurements of asteroids and Trans-Neptunian Objects. || 
|-id=998
| 42998 Malinafrank ||  || Frank Joseph Malina Jr (1912–1981), American aeronautical engineer and painter || 
|}

References 

042001-043000